"The Big Heat" is the debut solo single by American singer-songwriter Stan Ridgway, released in 1985 from his 1986 debut solo album The Big Heat. The song dates back to his time in Wall of Voodoo, and was performed live by the group in 1982.

Formats and track listings 
All songs written by Stan Ridgway, except where noted.

European 7" single (ILSA 6296)
"The Big Heat" – 4:32
"Drive, She Said" – 4:35

Australian 7" single (ILSA 12.6588)
"The Big Heat" – 4:32
"Pick It Up (And Put It in Your Pocket)" – 4:32

Netherlands 12" single (ILSA 12.7025)
"The Big Heat" – 4:33
"Stormy Side of Town" – 5:01
"Salesman" – 5:28

UK 7" single (IRM 123)
"The Big Heat" – 3:49 (remix)
"Foggy River" (Fred Rose) – 4:20

UK 12" single (IRMT 123)
"The Big Heat" – 3:52 (remix)
"Foggy River" (Fred Rose) – 4:20
"Salesman" – 5:26

Charts

References

External links 
 

1985 songs
1985 debut singles
1986 singles
I.R.S. Records singles
Stan Ridgway songs
Songs written by Stan Ridgway
Song recordings produced by Hugh Jones (producer)